Obaye Airport  is an airstrip serving  Obaye, a village in the North Kivu Province of the Democratic Republic of the Congo.

See also

Transport in the Democratic Republic of the Congo
List of airports in the Democratic Republic of the Congo

References

External links
OpenStreetMap - Obaye
OurAirports - Obaye
FallingRain - Obaye Airport

Airports in North Kivu